Chalet Girl is a 2011 romantic comedy sports film directed by Phil Traill. The film stars Felicity Jones, Ed Westwick, Tamsin Egerton, Ken Duken, Sophia Bush, Bill Bailey, Brooke Shields and Bill Nighy. The film was produced by Pippa Cross, Harriet Rees, Dietmar Guentsche and Wolfgang Behr, and written by Tom Williams. It was filmed on location in Sankt Anton am Arlberg, Austria and in Garmisch-Partenkirchen, Germany. Critical reaction to the film was mixed, while Jones' performance was praised. The film earned $4,811,510 on an £8,000,000 budget.

Plot
Kim Mathews (Felicity Jones) is introduced by a television presenter (Miquita Oliver) as a former skateboarding champion whose mother was killed in a car accident. Kim gives up skateboarding and begins working in a fast food burger bar to pay household bills to help her father (Bill Bailey).

When she and her father need more money to pay the bills, Kim goes looking for a job with better pay. Her friend recommends a job called a "chalet girl", working in the Alps for rich clients. She is initially turned down, but Kim is accepted for the job at the last minute as the current chalet girl broke her leg. Another chalet girl, Georgie (Tamsin Egerton), is sent to help Kim out. The two initially don't like each other, as Kim is anything but posh or glamorous. She can't ski or snowboard as she has never been to the Alps. Kim is instantly attracted to Jonny (Ed Westwick) the rich son of Richard (Bill Nighy) and Caroline (Brooke Shields), although Jonny is in a relationship with another woman, Chloe (Sophia Bush).

Since Kim is living next to the mountains she tries to teach herself to snowboard, but finds this difficult. Mikki (Ken Duken), seeing her struggle, helps her out and teaches her to snowboard, noticing that she has a natural talent. He persuades her to try out for a snowboarding competition to win €25,000.

Georgie and Kim begin to warm to each other, and the former finds out it is Kim's birthday. She takes Kim to a club where they get drunk. She persuades Kim to take the party back to where they are staying, as the family are out. The group of Georgie, Kim, Mikki and Georgie's friend Jules (Georgia King), return to the Chalet and relax nude in the hot tub. Georgie and Mikki begin to hook up.

When Kim gets out of the tub to shovel snow on herself, the family returns home and sees her naked. Georgie and Kim clean the house thoroughly and attempt to pay the family back for any damage that was done to the house. Meanwhile, Kim continues to work on her snowboarding skills and tries to conquer her fear of the high jumps as it brings back the memory of the car crash.

Kim and Jonny become closer and after a business trip to the chalet he decides to stay behind, presumably to spend more time with Kim. Jonny offers to pay her to teach him how to snowboard, which brings them closer and after a day in the snow they kiss briefly and end up having sex. An onlooker, Bernhard (Gregor Bloéb), had spotted them earlier and had alerted Jonny's mother, Caroline. The morning after their one-night stand, Caroline catches them and mentions that Jonny is engaged to Chloe. Kim packs her things, leaving the house upset and angry that Jonny lied to her.

Before she departs for home, her father persuades her to stay and try to win the competition, saying it would have been what her mother wanted. Meanwhile, Jonny breaks up with Chloe at their engagement party in London. Chloe asks if he is in love with Kim, which he confirms. After hearing the news of their break up, Kim seems to not care about Jonny anymore.

Mikki and Kim both begin the snowboard competition. Mikki fails to make the high jump and ends up breaking his arm, which takes him out of the running. Kim does well on all obstacles until she gets to the high jump; she stops as she remembers the car accident again. She places 21st in the competition, not placing high enough to make the top 20 finalists. However, she is the first reserve if any finalists drop out. Just then, world champion Tara (Tara Dakides, as herself), pulls out and gives her spot to Kim.

Kim makes all obstacles and jumps, and visualizing her mother cheering her on from the crowd, she lands the high jump perfectly and wins. Jonny, having come back after breaking up with Chloe, appears behind Kim and apologizes. The two banter for a moment before they kiss. We then see Richard and Caroline watching the competition on TV, where the camera captures Jonny and Kim kissing. Caroline, seeing how happy her son is, gives in and agrees to accept Kim.

Cast

Felicity Jones was cast in the lead role of Kim. Producer Pippa Cross recalled the moment that they first met, "I remember her walking into the room when we were casting and the director Phil Traill looked at me and raised his eyebrows at me and I said: ‘That's Kim’. It was as simple as that." She was known to the production staff previously following a ten year stint in The Archers and the Royal Court Theatre production of That Face. Jones described her character as a "witty, spirited beast", and cited the collaborative process with Traill as the reason why she took on the role.

Ed Westwick, best known for playing Chuck Bass in Gossip Girl, was cast as Jonny. He took the role for a change of genre, because he liked the idea of playing a "nice guy", and in order to practise his skiing. He said of the film, "It's a return to that sort of English comedy that I grew up with. It has elements of Richard Curtis and that classic English wit, which is great".

Brooke Shields became attached to the project as Caroline, Jonny's mother, about a month before her shooting began. Shields described herself as "honored" to be working with Bill Nighy who was cast as her on–screen husband, Richard.

Comedian Bill Bailey plays Bill, the father of Kim. He was approached by director Phil Traill who used to live nearby to Bailey and took him for a drink down the local pub and was "chuffed" to get the role.

Playing the character of Georgie was Tamsin Egerton, who joined the project because of the quality of the script, in particular the banter between Georgie and Kim, and became attached quite early as she was eager to work with Felicity Jones. She had auditioned a year before filming started and had assumed she hadn't got the part. Her only concern was that Georgie was quite similar to the character she portrayed in St Trinian's and St Trinian's 2.

German Ken Duken met the producers initially at the Berlin International Film Festival, and was cast as the Finn Mikki after being called in to audition. Tara Dakides, a professional snowboarder, portrayed herself in the film. She first became involved in the summer of 2009 and felt "extremely flattered as well as terrified" about playing herself on screen. In addition, Sophia Bush was cast as Chloe, Nicholas Braun as Nigel, and Georgia King as Jules.

Production

Development
Chalet Girl was one of a number of pitches by Tom Williams to producer Harriet Rees at the International Screenwriters' Festival, Cheltenham in 2007. Williams had previously worked at Working Title Films as a script reader, and described himself as sharing their "commercial sensibility". Rees described Chalet Girl as the pitch that stood out, and Williams began to work on a script. The first draft of the script was delivered on Christmas Eve 2007, with a further 123 versions created before shooting would finish. Rees went on to meet Phil Traill in Los Angeles regarding a different project which he decided against but following a phone call from Williams, who Traill knew from their time at Newcastle University, the director was attracted to the Chalet Girl script. First time feature producer Rees teamed up with Pippa Cross, who she described as her "mentor".

A few changes were made to the script during development, including removing a younger brother of the character Kim. Due to budgetary restraints, a number of scenes were dropped or the locations moved. Costume designers had to fly around to meet the actors' availability, including to New York City to meet with Ed Westwick and Soho, London with Bill Nighy. Both Nighy and Shields wore some of their own items on screen to save the film's budget, including Shields' engagement ring.

Reconnaissance trips were made to the resort of Méribel and to snowboarding championships in Laax. Traill joked that due to insurance reasons he was only allowed to ski on such recce trips, and so made as many of them as possible. The no-ski ban was extended to himself, Ed Westwick and Joe Geary, the first assistant director, during the early stages of production. It was partially funded by the UK Film Council, who gave it a grant of £800,000, and 10% of the budget was given by the Enterprise Investment Scheme.

Filming

Chalet Girl was filmed on location in Sankt Anton am Arlberg, in Tyrol, western Austria over the course of two months. Actor Ed Westwick went into filming as an already accomplished skier, having skied since the age of 12, but wasn't trained on the snowboard, only ever having had one lesson. Felicity Jones had only previously been on dry ski slopes as a child, and had never previously been on a snowboard. She trained for six hours a day for four weeks in order to become proficient enough to film. "I wanted to do as much of the groundwork on the board that Kim does as possible, hence the rigorous training. So, then towards the end I was able to do tiny little jumps." Jones also experienced life as a real chalet girl with staff at Flexiski. Tamsin Egerton signed on having had no experience on the slopes, and spent time with a trainer. Although she became "hooked" on skiing, in the final cut of the film she isn't actually seen skiing but can be seen on the blooper reel falling over on the slopes. Filming had to be stopped at one point, as the mountain had to be evacuated due to a snow storm. The village scenes were filmed in Garmisch-Partenkirchen in southern Germany, including using the interior of a German log cabin to double for a house in west London. The break-up scene was filmed in the Grand Hotel Sonnenbichl on the outskirts of Garmisch.

The majority of the cast were English, with Brooke Shields, Sophia Bush and Nicholas Braun being the exceptions. Bill Nighy filmed his scenes over a period of two weeks, and developed a football rivalry with Ed Westwick with the two actors supporting Manchester United and Chelsea respectively. Shields and Braun struck up a friendship during the filming with Shields describing it in interviews as wanting to "adopt him as my brother".

In the video Set Jetting in Tirol: St. Anton am Arlberg (English version),it is mentioned that the museum of local history in St. Anton was used for storing technical equipment and as a changing room for the actors.Wilma Himmelfreundpointer, female member of ski club's board of directors, appeared as an extra in the film.According to Wilma Himmelfreundpointer, Felicity Jones was not naked in her nude scene and wore a skin-coloured bodysuit.

Soundtrack
 Bad Company – Performed by This Is Freedom
 Posh Girls – Performed by Scouting for Girls
 Pack Up – Performed by Eliza Doolittle
 Edgar – Performed by Lucky Elephant
 Upside Down – Performed by Paloma Faith
 Tokyo (Vampires & Wolves) – Performed by The Wombats
 Disease – Performed by Livingston
 Go – Performed by Livingston
 Cola Coca – Performed by Rosie Oddie & The Odd Squad
 Sky Surfers – Performed by Toddla T
 Wake Up – Performed by Sliimy
 Fader – Performed by The Temper Trap
 Chicken Payback – Performed by The Bees
 Something Good Can Work – Performed by Two Door Cinema Club
 Who'd Want to Find Love? – Performed by Ellie Goulding and Jonny Lattimer
 Amazing – Performed by One Eskimo
 Explosions – Performed by Eli "Paperboy" Reed
 No Regrets – Performed by This Is Freedom
 Do You Want it All? – Performed by Two Door Cinema Club
 Where We Belong – Performed by Lostprophets
 Chequered Love – Performed by Kim Wilde

Promotion and release
The film was distributed by Paramount Pictures UK in 2011. Later in 2012, IFC Films acquired the US distribution rights and was given a limited release. The film was rated R in the US for some language, unlike in the UK, where it was given a 12 rating.

In order to promote the film, an online campaign was devised that integrated social media into an interactive trailer, where clicking on a "Like" button took viewers to additional features. Martin Talks, chief executive of digital agency Blue Barracuda said of the campaign, "Participation and sharing, such as this, and the convergence of media, like films and the internet, is the future of film making". The British premiere was held at Westfield London on 8 February 2011. Further showings were held across the country to raise money for Comic Relief 2011.

Reception

Critical response
 
Chalet Girl received mixed reviews. Rotten Tomatoes gives it a 77% rating based on 43 reviews, with an average score of 5.8/10.Metacritic gave the film a 46 out of 100, indicating "mixed or average reviews".

Alex Towers of Trinity News gave the film a negative review, saying "limping along from poor set-ups to glaringly obvious conclusions, the film's ninety-seven minutes feels three times as long." Michael Leader for Den of Geek gave the film two stars, describing some of the jokes as "god-awful", and found that the film "overstretched" itself, but described Felicity Jones as an "absolutely delightful screen presence". Peter Bradshaw also gave the film two stars in a review for The Guardian, describing it as "amiable, silly, feelgood stuff".

Other critics gave the film positive reviews, such as Tim Robey of The Telegraph, who gave the film three stars, describing Ed Westwick as "goofy", but praised the performance of Bill Bailey as "lovably hopeless". Time Out reviewer Dave Calhoun also gave it three stars, describing it as "loud, silly and surprisingly fun", and "corny and proud of it". The same star rating was given by Total Film, where Matthew Leyland described the production values as "tatty", but Felicity Jones as a "natural, likeable everygirl". The Mirror gave the film four stars, Mark Adams saying that the film was a "fun-packed affair" and when writing for Screen Daily saying "it is enjoyable entertainment with no real cinematic pretentions"; he laid particular praise on Felicity Jones saying that it confirms her qualities as a leading lady. Sophie Ivan for Film4 compared Chalet Girl to those from Working Title Films, saying that it was the first British comedy since then that "won't make you want to stick pins in your eyes", and gave three and a half stars.

Box office
In the UK in the first week of release, it was the top placed new film with £678,000 taken over the first five days having opened in 381 cinemas. That figure was the lowest for a top-placed new film since April 2010 with Whip It. This placed it in fourth place during the first week, behind Rango (£1,045,326), Battle: Los Angeles (£874,265) and Unknown (£775,576).

References

External links
 
 
 

2011 films
2011 romantic comedy films
Austrian romantic comedy films
Austrian sports comedy films
British romantic comedy films
British sports comedy films
English-language Austrian films
English-language German films
Films about interclass romance
Films set in the Alps
Films shot in Austria
Films shot in Germany
Films shot in London
German romantic comedy films
German sports comedy films
Snowboarding films
2010s sports comedy films
2010s English-language films
2010s British films
2010s German films